Back Roads may refer to:

 Back Roads (novel), a 2000 novel by the American writer Tawni O'Dell
 Back Roads (2018 film), a film based on the above novel
 Back Roads (album), a 2003 album by American guitarist Pat Donohue
 Back Roads (1981 film), an American romantic comedy film
 Back Roads (TV series), a 2015 Australian TV series
 Back Roads, an album by Kenny Rogers and The First Edition
 Back Roads (2020 novel), a thriller by Andrée A. Michaud

See also
Backroad (disambiguation)